Hugh Alexander Crawford, also referred to as H. Alexander Crawford, or H. Alex Crawford, (March 29, 1873 – February 2, 1951) was a Michigan politician.

Political life
Hugh Alexander Crawford was born in Otisville, Michigan on March 29, 1873. He was elected as the Mayor of the City of Flint in 1899 for a single one-year term.  He was a candidate in 1900 for Michigan Presidential Elector.

Post-political life
Crawford moved out of the city by 1916. He died in Flint on February 2, 1951.

References

Mayors of Flint, Michigan
1873 births
1951 deaths
Michigan Democrats
19th-century American politicians
20th-century American politicians